Saillans is the name of several communes in France:

 Saillans, Drôme, in the Drôme department
 Saillans, Gironde, in the Gironde department